Vinayak Raut (born 15 March 1954) is an Indian politician serving as the Member of Parliament, Loksabha. He is leader of Shiv Sena in Lok Sabha representing Ratnagiri-Sindhudurg constituency in the 17th Lok Sabha. Originally from Mumbai, Raut was previously elected as a member of the Maharashtra Legislative Assembly from Vile Parle of Mumbai for 1999-2004 as a Shiv Sena candidate. He was also elected as a member of Maharashtra Legislative Council from Shiv Sena Party in 2012. He resigned on 27 May 2014 from the Maharashtra Legislative Assembly. Raut was elected as MP for Ratnagiri-Sindhudurg constituency since the 2014 elections.

Positions held
 1985-1992: Councillor, B.M.C., Mumbai
 1999-2004: Member, Maharashtra Legislative Assembly
 2005: All India Party Secretary, Shiv Sena
 2012-2014: Member, Maharashtra Legislative Council  
 2014: Elected to 16th Lok Sabha
 2019: Elected to 17th Lok Sabha
2019: Leader Of Lok Sabha Shivsena

See also
 Lok Sabha Members

References

External links
 Shiv Sena Home Page
 Lok Sabha MP Biodata

People from Mumbai Suburban district
1954 births
Marathi politicians
Maharashtra MLAs 1999–2004
Living people
Members of the Maharashtra Legislative Council
India MPs 2014–2019
Lok Sabha members from Maharashtra
Shiv Sena politicians
People from Sindhudurg district
India MPs 2019–present